Chandrakanta — Ek Mayavi Prem Gaatha (English: Moonlight - An Elusive Love Story) is an Indian supernatural fantasy television series which premiered on Colors TV on 24 June 2017 and ended on 16 June 2018. Based on the 1888 novel of the same name by Devaki Nandan Khatri, it tells the story of Princess Chandrakanta. The show is produced by Ekta Kapoor and directed by Ranjan Kumar Singh under the Balaji Telefilms banner. The series stars Madhurima Tuli, Urvashi Dholakia, and Vishal Aditya Singh.

Plot
Princess Chandrakanta Jai Singh is born to Ratnaprabha, a great magician who has the most powerful dagger of Lord Vishnu. Iravati Singh, an evil queen wants the dagger to rule the world and conquers Vijaygarh. Ratnaprabha stores the dagger at a temple to protect and pass it to Chandrakanta after 21 years.

21 years later 

Iravati still searches for the dagger. Her stepson Veer plans to conquer Suryagarh kingdom. Chandrakanta, raised by a poor couple gets the dagger but doesn't know its powers.
He reaches Suryagarh, and wants revenge from Chandrakanta. However, they get romantically close and fall in love. But, Iravati succeeds in separating them. Veer unexpectedly stabs the dagger in Chandrakanta. Besides him, Iravati and her allies also brutally stab Chandrakanta, who falls off the cliff.

1 year later

Chandrakanta returns as Suryakanta. Veer has forgot their past and is a ruthless warrior under Iravati, who now owns the magical dagger. Veer eventually regains his memory and opposes Iravati. He fights her son Swayam, the beast but is unable to kill him, and finds out that Swayam is immortal blessed by Lord Vishnu. Iravati tries to find Chandrakanta. Veer receives new power of Narsimha, a powerful avatar of Lord Vishnu. Taking the form of great Narsimha, he kills Swayam and puts an end to terror of Hirnasur.

Iravati escapes and later returns. Chandrakanta gives birth to a daughter blessed to kill Iravati, who attacks Veer. She dies when Chandrakanta's daughter touches her. The daughter is named Suryakanta. In the end, Chandrakanta and Veer establish peace and prosperity in Vijaygarh.

Cast

Main 
 Madhurima Tuli as Rajkumari Chandrakanta Pratap Singh : Princess of Sooryagarh and later Queen of Vijaygarh, Veer's wife
 Vishal Aditya Singh as Veerendra "Veer" Pratap Singh: King of Vijaygarh, Chandrakanta's husband , Champa's ex-lover
 Urvashi Dholakia as Iravati Singh: Senior Queen of Vijaygarh; Veer's step-mother and Swayam's mother; a greedy, evil woman to find a dagger

Recurring
 Nikhil Arya as Dhruv Dhyani: Prince of Chandangarh, Chandrakanta's friend
 Shaad Randhawa as Swayam Singh: 2nd Prince of Vijaygarh; Veer's step-brother and Iravati's biological son
 Pooja Banerjee as Sooryakanta: Chandrakanta's disguise
 Punit Talreja as Kroor Singh
 Surjit Saha as Bhuwan
 Maleeka R Ghai as Bhadrama: witch; Iravati's former chief advisor
 Shilpa Sakhlani as Ratnaprabha: Queen of Vijaygarh; Jai Singh's wife; Chandrakanta's birth mother
 Sandeep Rajora as Raja Jai Singh: King of Vijaygarh; Ratnaprabha's husband; Chandrakanta's father
 Prerna Wanvari as Vishakha "Mayavi": Ratnaprabha's sister; Chandrakanta's maternal aunt
 Charvi Saraf/Renee Dhyani as Gehna
 Shreyas Pandit as Daksh Raj Rajput: Iravati's elder brother; Veer and Swayam's uncle 
 Lalit Sharma as Aryan Rajput: Iravati's nephew; Daksh and Nishi's son; Veer and Swayam's cousin 
 Roma Bali as Nishi: Daksh's wife; Aryan's mother; Iravati's sister-in-law; Veer and Swayam's aunt
 Rita Kaul Kotru as Aaina: Iravati's former advisor; a spirit residing inside a mythical mirror
 Surendra Thakur as monster
 Shrruti Gholap as Ruchi Singh: Chandrakanta's foster mother
 Nitin Wakhariya as Koopat Singh: Minister of Sooryagarh
 Ajay Arya as Tejendra "Tej" Singh: Veer's friend
 Nirmal Soni as Umang: a genie; Chandrakanta's friend
 Sunaina Shukla as Satakshi: Princess of Sooryagarh
 Deepak as Kancha: Iravati's secret shape-shifting spy
 Purvi Mundada as Champa: Veer's Lover
 Surendra Thakur as Beast
 Ethan rao as Saand Typhoon. 
 Surendra Pal as King Avantimala: Sooryagarh's monarch
 Neha Chowdhury as Daas
 Saman Sadiq Ahmad as Sooryagarh's soldier
 Shankar Mishra as Soorya's father
 Kratika Sengar as Narrator in Episode 1

References

External links
 

Balaji Telefilms television series
2017 Indian television series debuts
Colors TV original programming
Indian fantasy television series
Television shows based on Indian novels
2018 Indian television series endings